Eduardo Enrique "Wado" de Pedro (born 11 November 1976) is an Argentine lawyer and Justicialist Party politician currently serving as the country's Minister of the Interior. He previously served as National Deputy for Buenos Aires Province, as member of the Council of Magistracy, and General Secretary to President Cristina Fernández de Kirchner.

De Pedro was one of the founding members of La Cámpora, the Front for Victory's youth wing. He served as Vice-president of Aerolíneas Argentinas and Austral Líneas Aéreas from 2009 to 2011.

Early life and education
Eduardo Enrique de Pedro was born on 11 November 1976 in Mercedes, in Buenos Aires Province. His father, Eduardo Osvaldo de Pedro (b. 1950), a law student at the University of Buenos Aires and a member of the organization Montoneros, was killed by the last military dictatorship in Argentina in 1977. His mother, Lucila Adela Révora (b. 1953) was kidnapped by state authorities in 1978 while pregnant. Her name is mentioned in the Nunca Más report. The two-year-old Eduardo Enrique was thereafter raised by his aunt Estela Révora. 

De Pedro has had a stutter since childhood. Like his father, de Pedro studied law at the University of Buenos Aires, and then went on to receive a Master's Degree on public policy at the University of San Andrés. He is a founding member of HIJOS.

Political career
De Pedro's political career began in 2004 when he was designated Chief of Cabinet of the Undersecretariat of Tourism of Buenos Aires City, during the administration of Aníbal Ibarra. In 2006, alongside Máximo Kirchner, Andrés Larroque, Juan Cabandié, Mariano Recalde and José Ottavis, de Pedro co-founded La Cámpora, a youth political organization that acted as the youth wing of the Front for Victory. In 2009, he was appointed to the board of the recently re-nationalized Aerolíneas Argentinas and Austral Líneas Aéreas.

In 2011 he was elected to the Chamber of Deputies on the Front for Victory list, representing Buenos Aires Province. Representing the majority bloc in the Chamber, de Pedro was designated as member of the Council of Magistracy of the Nation in February 2014.

On 26 February 2015 he was designated as General Secretary of the Presidency under President Cristina Fernández de Kirchner, a post he held until 10 December 2015, when Fernández de Kirchner's term ended. De Pedro headed the Front for Victory's deputies party list in Buenos Aires Province in the 2015 legislative election, and in 2018 he was again designated as one of the Chamber's representatives to the Council of Magistracy, this time representing the minority bloc.

Since 10 December 2019, he has served in the cabinet of President Alberto Fernández as Minister of the Interior.

Electoral history

References

External links

Ministry of the Interior (in Spanish)
Official website of La Cámpora

1976 births
Living people
Justicialist Party politicians
Members of La Cámpora
Ministers of Internal Affairs of Argentina
Members of the Argentine Chamber of Deputies elected in Buenos Aires Province
Members of the Argentine Council of Magistracy
People from Mercedes, Buenos Aires
Children of people disappeared during Dirty War